National landscapes of Finland were selected by the Finnish Ministry of the Environment in 1992 as a part of the 75th anniversary of the Independence of Finland. The 27 selected landscapes represent the special environmental and cultural features of Finland. They have great symbolic value and significance in cultural or historical terms.

National landscapes

References

External links 
Meaningful National Landscape Outdoors.fi

Geography of Finland